Nangal Thakran is a census town in Narela Block in the Indian state of Delhi.

Demographics
 India census, Nangal Thakran had a population of 3558. Males constitute 54% of the population and females 46%. In Nangal Thakran, 94% of the population is under 60 years of age. The total geographical area of village is 534 hectares. There are about 722 houses in Nangal Thakran village. Bawana is nearest town to Nangal Thakran which is approximately 5 km away.

In Nangal Thakran the most of the population is of Jaats. They are a dominant farming community who own their land. The Jaats have a reputation of being a feisty, hardworking people who are dedicated to community service. The word Jat is derived from Jatta, a generic term for cattle grazers and camel breeders, moving in a group or federation – jatha. They have been known as zamindars (landowner) since the Mogul emperor, Akbar's reign in the 16th century. Other occupations pursued by the Jaat are animal husbandry, transport business, trade, and government and private service, and are teachers, doctors, engineers and surveyors.

The village produces the finest quality of wheat, rice, sugarcane and other agricultural produce that is sold in local markets in Delhi.  Most of the households have their main income from agriculture and some have private and public jobs.

References

Politics

In 2017, Nangal Thakran was included in wards of mcd and Poonam Pawan Sehrawat was elected a councilor for the first time .

Cities and towns in North West Delhi district